The CANT Z.501 Gabbiano (Italian: Gull)
was a high-wing central-hull flying boat, with two outboard floats. It was powered  by a single engine installed in the middle of the main-plane and had a crew of 4–5 men.
It served with the Italian Regia Aeronautica during World War II, as a reconnaissance aeroplane. During its debut in 1934, it set a world distance record. It was obsolete by 1940, but was still used throughout World War II, suffering many losses. A few remained in service until 1949.

Development
Filippo Zappata was one of the foremost Italian aircraft designers. He worked for Cantieri Aeronautici e Navali Triestini (CANT) for some years, but went to France in 1927 to work for Blériot. He returned to Italy at the prompting of Italo Balbo and resumed work at CANT on a series of new aircraft. The first of these was the Z.501, designed to replace the Savoia-Marchetti S.78. The prototype Z.501 was first flown in 1934 by test pilot Mario Stoppani.

Design

The aircraft had a very slim fuselage, a high parasol wing and a single wing-mounted engine nacelle. In the prototype a 560 kW (750 hp) inline Isotta Fraschini Asso-750.RC engine was fitted, with an annular (circular) radiator that made the installation resemble a radial engine, although it was actually a liquid-cooled inline. Some versions of other planes such as the Ju 88 and Fw 190D had this same feature. The engine nacelle was extended to carry a rear-facing machine gun, while other guns were mounted in the centre fuselage and nose. All were 7.7 mm (.303 in) Breda-SAFAT machine guns. Bombs up to 640 kg/1,410 lb (4 × 160 kg/350 lb) were carried under the wings. The aerodynamic low-drag design was typical of Zappata-designed aircraft, as was the wooden construction.

Production of the Z.501 began in 1935 with 24 aircraft ordered from CANT, and 30 from Aeronautica Sicula, a company in Palermo. Registration numbers started with MM.35168.

Operational history

Record flights
The production aircraft had an endurance of 12 hours. However, the record-breaking version, as was quite common at the time (mainly due to the low fuel consumption of the piston engine), greatly exceeded this. The USA had established a new endurance record of 3,860 km (2,400 mi); a Z.501 with the civilian registration I-AGIL was used to re-take the record in accordance with dictator Benito Mussolini's wishes. It was manned by Stoppani and two others, fitted with a special metal three-blade propeller, and other modifications.

On 19–20 May 1934, the modified Z.501 established a new seaplane distance record of 4,130 km (2,570 mi), by flying from Monfalcone to Massawa, in Eritrea, in 26 hours and 35 minutes. This distance record was lost to a French aircraft that flew 4,335 km (2,694 mi) on 23 June the same year, so another record flight was made on 16 July. The plan was to fly to Djibouti, a distance of 4,700 km (2,900 mi), but instead the aircraft flew 4,930 km (3,060 mi) to Berbera, Somaliland, in 25 hours.

Military service
Z.501's were used for search-and-rescue missions and anti-submarine patrols. The Z.501 was put into service with some modifications, including; turrets for the machine guns, and some reinforcement of the airframe that increased the overall weight by 500 kg (1,100 lb). The more powerful 656 kW (880 hp) Isotta Fraschini Asso XI.RC engine was fitted, but even with an additional 97 kW (130 hp), the maximum speed dropped to 245 km/h (152 mph), cruise speed to 200 km/h (120 mph), and range to 2,400 km (1,500 mi).

The first units equipped were No.141 Sqn., Eritrea, No.83 Group, Augusta, No.85, Elmas, and No.62, Spain (for operations). By the time Italy entered World War II on 10 June 1940, 202 aircraft were in service in 15 squadrons. They were used by 20 Sqn. and patrolled the Mediterranean, as well as performing air-sea rescue operations. During the short campaign against France, seven Z.501s were destroyed by a French attack on their base in Sardinia. Another crashed the next day. In July, encounters with Royal Navy Fleet Air Arm fighters and accidents claimed many Z.501s, with a total of 11 destroyed in action, while the number that were operational dropped to 77. The Z.501 operated in all theatres and 62 aircraft were lost in 1940, leaving 126, of which only 87 were operational. New orders were placed with the manufacturer Aeronautica Sicula. 

At the end of 1941, there were Z.501s in 15 of the 27 squadrons dedicated to naval reconnaissance. They were able to carry up to four bombs; either 50 kg (110 lb) or 160 kg (352 lb) with a maximum payload of 640kg.

By the end of 1942, there were 199 aircraft in service, 88 of which were operational. Maritime reconnaissance had at that time 290 aircraft in total. By September 1943, there were still 240 aircraft assigned to maritime reconnaissance: only 84 were Z.501s, in three squadrons, and another 11 (mixed), out of 20 in total. Only around 40 aircraft were operational. Total production, 218 by CANT and 236 by Aeronautica Sicula, but 12 incomplete aircraft were captured after the invasion of Sicily. Later, Aeronautica Sicula repaired many of the ICAF aircraft. Some modifications were adopted during production, such as the removal of the nose machine gun and replacing it with an enclosed fairing.

Some Z.501s were supplied to Romania and to the Nationalists during the Spanish Civil War. Following Italy's surrender in 1943, a few of these flying boats continued to operate with both the Axis Aeronautica Nazionale Repubblicana and the Allied Italian Co-Belligerent Air Force.  After the armistice, several flew to southern Italy, including the nine aircraft of 149 Sqn with 80 persons aboard. In October, there were 16 aircraft operational in southern Italy, which dropped to 10 by May 1945. The squadrons involved were Nos 141, 147, and 183. After the war 183 Sqn. was based at Elmas with four Z.501s, and these were scrapped in 1950.

Romanian service
In 1941, twelve Z.501s were exported to Romania. One of these 12 flying boats was lost during the war, shot down in the autumn of 1943 by Soviet ace Grigoriy Rechkalov. The Gabbianos performed well in the Black Sea, a single unit managing to sink two Soviet submarines in August 1941.

Combat performance
Generally, the Z.501 had a mixed reputation. It was pleasant to fly, having low wing loading and good performance (when it was first introduced). It was quite reliable despite having only one liquid-cooled engine. However, there were problems with the durability of the wooden fuselage, particularly the aircraft built during the war. Its seafaring qualities were poor and the aircraft was susceptible to bad weather conditions. The fuselage would often break up in rough seas. Another problem was the engine nacelle: if the aircraft landed heavily the propeller could crash down into the cockpit.

The aircraft was used in the reconnaissance role thanks to its long endurance, but it was very vulnerable to enemy fighters or even bombers. Perhaps its only air victory was in the Aegean, when a fighter stalled while chasing a Z.501. The aircraft was more often relegated to second-line duties. Sometimes, with well-trained crews, it was able to attack submarines, damaging several of them (perhaps six in total) and contributing to the destruction of two others. The aircraft had no advanced detection systems, only depth charges.

Generally the aircraft's main task was search and rescue missions, and perhaps because of this it was called Mammaiuto (which means "Mamma help me!" in Italian). Another theory is that it earned the nickname because it was helpless against enemy aircraft. Even its sea capabilities were poor, and often the Z.501 needed to be helped by ships. As for its flying qualities, it was too slow, unmanoeuvrable, and under-armed to put up a defence against enemy fighters. As a result, many were shot down.

Military operators

 Regia Aeronautica
 Aviazione Legionaria operated 9 aircraft
 Italian Co-Belligerent Air Force
 Aeronautica Nazionale Repubblicana

 Italian Air Force operated few aircraft until 1948

 Spanish Air Force

 Royal Romanian Naval Aviation (12 purchased in 1941)

Specifications (Z.501)

See also

Notes

Bibliography

 Angelucci, Enzo and Paolo Matricardi. World Aircraft: World War II, Volume I (Sampson Low Guides). Maidenhead, UK: Sampson Low, 1978. .

 Bishop, Chris, ed. The Encyclopedia of Weapons of World War II. New York: Barnes & Noble, 1998. .
Donald, David, ed. The Complete Encyclopedia of World Aircraft. London: Amber Books, 2001. .
 Jackson, Robert. The Encyclopedia of Military Aircraft. London: Paragon, 2002. .
 Marcon, Tullio. "Il CANT Z.501 Gabbiano. (Italian)". Parma: Storia Militare Magazione, November 1995, pp 10–21.

Z.0501
1930s Italian patrol aircraft
Flying boats
Single-engined tractor aircraft
Parasol-wing aircraft